Minnehaha Creek is a 22-mile-long (35 km) tributary of the Mississippi River that flows east from Gray's Bay Dam on Lake Minnetonka  through the suburban cities of Minnetonka, Hopkins, Saint Louis Park, and Edina, and the city of Minneapolis. The creek flows over Minnehaha Falls in Minnehaha Park near its mouth at the Mississippi River.

History

As with much of the Midwest, the area around the creek and Lake Minnetonka was originally inhabited by a native culture affiliated with the Mound Builders, but by the 1700s was occupied by the Mdewakanton People, a sub-tribe of the Dakota. The first Euro-Americans whose expedition to the area was documented were Joe Brown and Will Snelling, who canoed up the creek from Fort Snelling.

Watershed
The creek's watershed covers 181 square miles (470 km2), including the basin of Lake Minnetonka, and is managed by the Minnehaha Creek Watershed District.

References

Rivers of Hennepin County, Minnesota
Rivers of Minnesota
Tributaries of the Mississippi River